The Tadrart Rouge (meaning "Red Mountain") or Southern Tadrart or Algerian Tadrart or Meridional Tadrart is a mountain range in southeastern Algeria, part of the Algerian Desert. The area has a rich array of rock art.

Geography
The Tadrart Rouge is a roughly 15–30 km large and 150 km long southern prolongation of the Libyan Tadrart Acacus into Algeria spanning to the frontier of Niger. Primarily composed of sandstone, it links the Tassili n’Ajjer in the north-west to the Djado in the southeast. The range is broken by a series of west-east oriented fossil drainage networks resulting in deep gorges. In Djaren, discharging into the erg of Tin Merzuga, is the most important one. The range reaches its maximum elevation of  towards its southern end about 160 km southeast of Djanet.

Erosion has formed a large number of natural arches. The area is well known for the spectacular red-orange sand dune fields contrasting with the jagged dark red rock formations of the range.

Palaeoclimate
The Tadrart Rouge is today harsh and dry with almost no precipitation. But during the African humid period the area had rainfall and was covered by savanna vegetation and thus was suitable for human and animal life.

Rock art
The Tadrart Rouge has magnificent Saharan rock art covering a long chronological span from early Neolithic to recent times. Rock walls and rock shelters on wadi bottoms are dotted with both rock paintings and rock engravings, documenting climate change as the area evolved from a savanna 10,000 years ago to a desert 5,000 years ago. The rock art changed in time from wild fauna such as elephants, rhinos, giraffes, antelopes, and wild bovids, to domesticated animals such as bovids, ovicaprids, horses, and camels.

References

External links

La tadrart rouge. Algérie

Mountain ranges of Algeria
Saharan rock art
Prehistoric Africa
Archaeological sites in Algeria
Natural arches